The Powell Marsh Wildlife Area is a  tract of protected land located in Vilas and Iron counties, Wisconsin, owned and partially managed by the Wisconsin Department of Natural Resources (WDNR). The wildlife area is bordered by the Northern Highland-American Legion State Forest and Manitowish Chain O Lakes to the north, east, and west and the Lac du Flambeau Reservation to the south.

History
The first development within the current bounds of the wildlife area was a short track of rail used to transport lumber, built sometime before the 1930s. In the years leading up to the 1950s, wildfires would often break out and burn into the marsh. These burns helped new vegetation spring up from the peat, which in turn attracted geese to the area. Hunters and landowners in the area then petitioned the Wisconsin Conservation Department (a precursor to the WDNR) to purchase land in the general area to establish a protected habitat area to keep stocks of geese and other fowl strong.

Early efforts to secure the integrity of the habitat resulted in the construction of various dikes and drainage ditches to allow for controlled burns to take place that would allow for the planting of plants to be consumed by flocks of geese. In 1957 a decoy flock of geese was placed in the wildlife area that was initially successful in attracting migrating flocks, yet with each passing year, the efficacy waned, until the decoy flock was removed in 1974. An investigation determined by the WDNR concluded that the dwindling flocks of geese could be attributed to a shift in migration patterns and the base inhospitableness of the marsh.

In 2013 planning for the master plan resumed after a 13-year hiatus due to the WDNR focusing its efforts on the master plan for the neighboring Northern Highland-American Legion State Forest. The current master plan for the wildlife area was approved and published in December 2016. The current management strategy centers on the manipulation of water levels to shift land cover to be more suitable for shorebirds and other waterfowl.

Much of the original and current funding comes from the Pittman–Robertson Federal Aid in Wildlife Restoration Act.

Powell Marsh
The whole of the Powell Marsh Wildlife Area is classified further as a habitat management area, with the goal of providing a habitat for species that require wetland or aquatic areas. Within the confines of the Marsh, there are five separate lakes and seven flowages that are managed by the WDNR. 

In addition to the 4,850 acres owned by the state, there are  owned privately, most of which are used as easements. There are five different types of cover in the wildlife area, including forested wetland, grassy upland islands, open water, upland forest fringe, and the most common, unforested wetland.

Ceded territory

The Powell Marsh Wildlife Area is within the boundaries of the ceded territory of the 1837 and 1842 treaties with the Chippewa, and as such is subject to management by the Lac du Flambeau Band of Lake Superior Chippewa via an Integrated Resource Management Plan. These two treaties dictated that the Ojibwe tribes in the area would cede lands in the north of Wisconsin to the United States Government. In return for ceding ownership of their native lands, they were granted access to hunt, fish, and gather within some public areas.

The Lac du Flambeau Band controls plans for the development and conservation of the area with this strategic document. The IRMP in place and the treaties of 1837 and 1842 allow for the Band to use the wildlife area for hunting, fishing, and other tribal activities.

Dead Pike Lake
Dead Pike Lake is to the northwest and downstream of the Powell Marsh Wildlife Area, and as such the health and water quality of the lake are very closely tied to the actions and manipulations done to the wildlife area. In the mid-1950s, construction of water control structures and an extensive ditch and levee road system began, which did restore much of the original marshland but also cut deep into the bog's semi-aquitard layer. This caused the groundwater and surface water to react with each other.

In addition to the iron-rich surface water that began to put increased pressure on groundwater in the area, the water control structures were also constructed primarily with taconite ore, which further allowed for iron and manganese to react with surface water in both the lake and the marsh. 

While the groundwater in the area is already rich in iron, the iron contained within it would usually precipitate when exposed to oxygen. However, when the iron-rich groundwater was allowed to mix with the marsh's surface water, filled with decomposed organic material, the oxidation process takes far longer, which allows bacteria to form on the iron, creating iron floc. Not only is the iron floc visible in the water, but it has turned the lake rusty-brown in some areas, and in others has turned the water slimy.

Flora and fauna
The Powell Marsh Wildlife Area has five defined types of ground cover, and thus has multiple different species of trees. The most commonly observed trees in the wildlife area consist of aspen, white birch, red maple, red oak, white pine, black spruce, and tamarack. In addition to trees, there are various aquatic plants and shrubs, including willow and sphagnum moss.

In 2016, 205 different species of bird were observed in the wildlife area, including 34 species of birds that are labeled as either protected, threatened, endangered, or of special concern. The only species of bird labeled as endangered known to either nest or migrate in the wildlife area is the black tern, which while labeled as of least concern by the IUCN, is currently on the list of endangered birds in the state of Wisconsin. Other rare birds considered in danger found to be in the wildlife area include the LeConte's sparrow, Nelson's sparrow, and the threatened Yellow rail.

Other documented rare mammalian species observed in the wildlife area include the gray wolf (listed as of special concern), hoary bat (listed as of special concern), little brown bat (threatened), and the silver-haired bat (special concern). Rare species besides mammals include the American bullfrog, mink frog, wingless mountain grasshopper, bog copper butterfly, and the frigga fritillary butterfly.

The wildlife area is a habitat founded specifically for the preservation and hunting of ducks and other waterfowl and is also known for its stock of mink and muskrats.

Recreation
Hunting, fishing, and trapping are allowed in the wildlife area, although other recreational activities such as camping and hiking are limited by poor soil quality. Viewing sites in the area are easily accessible by main roads in the general area, and the Marsh is a popular spot for birdwatchers. Fishing is available in both Dead Pike Lake and Sherman lake, both of which are attached to the wildlife area and subject to catch limitations set by the WDNR, with the focus of such limits being set around the catching of walleye, also called the yellow pike or yellow pickerel, despite it not having any relation to the pickerel family.

There is one managed trail in the wildlife area, the  Powell Marsh Ski Trail. The Ski Trail is managed by the Northern Highland-American Legion State Forest and is available for hiking in non-winter months. There are two other trails in the wildlife area that are under construction; the Regional Bike Trail and the Vista Flowage Loop.

See also
 Chemistry of wetland dredging

References

External links
 U.S. Geological Survey Map at the U.S. Geological Survey Map Website. Retrieved March 2nd, 2022.
 The Economic Impact of the 1837 and 1842 Chippewa Treaties at JSTOR. Retrieved March 2nd, 2022. 

Geography of Iron County, Wisconsin
Geography of Vilas County, Wisconsin
Protected areas established in 1955
Protected areas of Wisconsin
State Wildlife Area